Eva Feřteková (born 14 April 1985 in Prague) is a Czech professional squash player. As of February 2018, she was ranked number 102 in the world.

References

1985 births
Living people
Czech female squash players
Sportspeople from Prague
20th-century Czech women
21st-century Czech women